Justin Rogers may refer to:
Justin Rogers (cornerback), American football cornerback
Justin Rogers (linebacker), American football linebacker